The Karenni Nationalities Defence Force is an armed insurgent group in Myanmar formed in response to the 2021 Myanmar coup d'état. The group contains the PDFs that have been officially announced. The KNDF also includes other organizations, such as the KNPP. "The EAOs here are in agreement with the public," remarked a KNDF official. the KNDF has engaged in fighting with the junta, fighter jets and tanks have been deployed by the junta to combat the group.

Purpose
In an interview, a spokesperson of the KNDF told media groups that the KNDF is a fusion of all Karenni State's dispersed youth forces. Uniting them to more effectively fight the junta. It was also stated that they have a shortage of weapons and ammunition.

Objective
The objective of the KNDF is the same as other resistant groups in Myanmar; to overthrow the  military junta. It is also to ensure the unity of the people in Karenni State, encourage collaboration and pay special attention to the Karenni National Progressive Party's position (KNPP).

Defence Policy
The KNDF, which was founded alongside the regional PDFs and other militias, follows the NUG and CRPH's defence policy, according to the KNDF's spokesperson.

The NUG's Ministry of Defence published a seven-point defense policy with the goal of ensuring that the defense industry is democratically controlled and operates according to a federal system.

The policy encompasses leadership, defence policy formulation and execution, legislative and judicial checks and balances on the military sector, defence administration, the enforcement of internationally recognized laws and ethics, title and duty designation, financial management, and resource sharing.

According to the KNDF's spokesman, the KNDF, which was founded in accordance with the NUG's defense plans, has three Karenni State-based PDFs, two Shan State-based PDFs, and several EAOs.

Conflicts

The KNDF has been involved in the Myanmar civil war since May 2021. In 2022, they engaged in 341 clashes with the regime killing 797 junta troops and suffering 65 losses.

See also

 2021–2022 Myanmar insurgency
 People's Defence Force (Myanmar)
 Karenni National Progressive Party

References

Paramilitary organisations based in Myanmar
Karen people